Roselle is a station on Metra's Milwaukee District West Line in Roselle, Illinois. In Metra's zone-based fare system, Roselle is in zone E. As of 2018, Roselle is the 24th busiest of Metra's 236 non-downtown stations, with an average of 1,448 weekday boardings.

As of December 12, 2022, Roselle is served by 46 trains (23 in each direction) on weekdays, by all 24 trains (12 in each direction) on Saturdays, and by all 18 trains (nine in each direction) on Sundays and holidays.

References

External links 

Station House from Google Maps Street View

Metra stations in Illinois
Former Chicago, Milwaukee, St. Paul and Pacific Railroad stations
Roselle, Illinois
Railway stations in DuPage County, Illinois
Railway stations in the United States opened in 1922